The Northwest Educational Services (formerly the Traverse Bay Area Intermediate School District) is a coordinating School District in Michigan, USA.

It oversees the school districts in the counties of Antrim, Benzie, Grand Traverse, Kalkaska, and Leelanau. The intermediate school district provides services for 27,000 students.

Northwest Education Services Career Tech 
Northwest Education Services Career Tech, located in Traverse City, provides technical vocational training to students in the intermediate school district. The Principal is Pat Lamb.

School districts 

 Alba Public Schools
 Bellaire Public Schools
 Benzie Central Schools
 Buckley Community Schools
 Crawford School-Excelsior District #1
 Elk Rapids Public Schools
 Forest Area Community Schools
 Frankfort–Elberta Area Schools
 Glen Lake Community Schools
 Kalkaska Public Schools
 Kingsley Area Schools
 Leland Public Schools
 Mancelona Public Schools
 Northport Public School
 Suttons Bay Public Schools
 Traverse City Area Public Schools

Public school academies 

 Grand Traverse Academy
 Greenspire School
 Leelanau Montessori Public School Academy
 North Central Academy
 Woodland School

Nonpublic area schools 

 Grand Traverse Area Catholic Schools
 Interlochen Arts Academy
 New Covenant Christian Academy
 The Children's House
 St. Mary Lake Leelanau Catholic School
 St. Mary of Hannah School
 The Leelanau School
 The Pathfinder School
 Traverse Bay Mennonite School
 Traverse City Christian School
 Trinity Lutheran School

References

External links 
 Official site

Intermediate school districts in Michigan
Education in Antrim County, Michigan
Education in Benzie County, Michigan
Education in Grand Traverse County, Michigan
Education in Kalkaska County, Michigan
Education in Leelanau County, Michigan
Education in Manistee County, Michigan
Education in Wexford County, Michigan